The Veetrirundha Perumal Temple is a Hindu temple situated in the village of Veppathur in the Thiruvidaimarudur taluk of Thanjavur district, Tamil Nadu, India. The temple is dedicated to God Vishnu. The stone and mortar temple is believed to have been constructed in about 850 CE by the Pallavas and was later renovated by the Chola king Raja Raja Chola and by Krishnadevaraya in 1520 CE. The temple is built on top of an older brick temple some of whose remains have survived. The remains constitute one of the two surviving Hindu temples of the pre-Pallava period, the other being the Murugan temple at Saluvankuppam, and one of the oldest ones in Tamil Nadu.

Notes

References 
 

Vishnu temples
Hindu temples in Thanjavur district
Dravidian architecture
Chola architecture
Pallava architecture